A Persian drill is a drill which is turned by pushing a nut back and forth along a spirally grooved drill holder. It was formerly used for delicate operations such as jewellery making and dentistry. A ratcheting screwdriver with a 'spiral ratchet' mechanism may be used as a Persian drill.

References

Tools

Hole making